Shipwrecking is an event that causes a shipwreck, such as a ship striking something that causes the ship to sink; the stranding of a ship on rocks, land or shoal; poor maintenance; or the destruction of a ship either intentionally or by violent weather.

Causes 

Factors for the loss of a ship may include:

 poor design or failure of the ship's equipment or hull - pressure hull
 instability, due to poor design, improperly stowed cargo, cargo that shifts its position or the free surface effect
 navigation errors and other human errors, leading to collisions (with another ship, rocks, an iceberg, etc.) or running aground (Costa Concordia)
 bad weather and powerful or large waves or gale winds: This often leads to capsizing, also referred to as foundering
 warfare, piracy, mutiny, or sabotage including: guns, torpedoes, depth charges, mines, bombs and missiles
 fire
 biofouling, such as accumulation of polychaete and other tube worms on wood hulls
 overloading - either cargo or icing, and displacement exceeding the plimsoll line
 intentional sinking (scuttling)
 to form an artificial reef
 for wreck diving
 use as a target ship for training or testing weapons
 as a blockship to create an obstacle to close a harbour, river, etc. against enemy ships
 to prevent a ship from falling into an enemy's hands (e.g. Admiral Graf Spee)
 to destroy a derelict ship that poses a menace to navigation
 as part of an insurance scam

Design and equipment failure 
The hallmark of a shipwreck due to poor design is the capsize of Swedish warship Wasa in Stockholm harbour 1628. She was too narrow, had too little ballast and her lower cannon deck had too low free-board for good seaworthiness. Poor design allowed the ferry MS Herald of Free Enterprise to put to sea with open roll-on/roll-off bow doors, with tragic consequences.
Failure or leaking of the hull is a serious problem that can lead to the loss of buoyancy or the free surface effect and the subsequent sinking of the vessel. Even the hulls of large modern ships have cracked in heavy storms. Leaks between the hull planks of wooden vessels are a particular problem.

Equipment failure caused the shipwreck of cruiseferry Estonia in 1994. The stress of stormy seas on hull and bow especially caused the bow visor to break off, in turn tearing the watertight bow door open and letting seawater flow onto the car deck. She capsized with tragic consequences. Failure of pumps can lead to the loss of a potentially salvageable ship with only a minor leak or fire.

Failure of the means of propulsion, such as engines, sails or rigging, can lead to the loss of a ship. When the ship's movement is determined only by currents or the wind and particularly by storms, a common result is that the ship is unable to avoid natural hazards like rocks, shallow water or tidal races.  Loss of propulsion or steering can inhibit a ship's ability to safely position itself in a storm, even far from land.  Waves attacking a ship's side can overwhelm and sink it.

Instability and foundering 
Instability is caused by the centre of mass of the ship rising above the metacenter resulting in the ship tipping on its side or capsizing. To remain buoyant, the hull of a vessel must prevent water entering the large air spaces of the vessel (known as downflooding). Clearly for the ship to float, the normally submerged parts of the hull will be watertight, but the upper parts of the hull must have openings to allow ventilation to compartments, including the engine room, for crew access, and to load and unload cargo. In a capsize, water can enter these openings if not watertight. If a ship sinks after capsizing, or as a consequence of a leak in the hull or other water ingress, it may be described as having foundered or foundering. Large ships are designed with compartments to help preserve the necessary buoyancy.

Bad weather 

On 25 October 2012, the tall ship Bounty (a replica of the original HMS Bounty) sank in a hurricane. The vessel left New London, Connecticut, heading for St. Petersburg, Florida, initially going on an easterly course to avoid Hurricane Sandy. On 29 October 2012 at 03:54 EDT, the ship's owner called the United States Coast Guard for help during the hurricane after losing contact with the ship's master. There were sixteen people aboard, two of whom did not survive the sinking. An inquiry into the sinking was held by the United States Coast Guard in Portsmouth, Virginia from 12 to 21 February 2013; at which it was concluded that Captain Walbridge's decision to sail the ship into the path of Hurricane Sandy was the cause, and the inquiry found this to have been a "reckless decision". 

Poor weather can cause several problems:
 high winds
 low visibility
 cold weather
 high waves

Wind causes waves which result in other difficulties. Waves make navigation difficult and dangerous near shallow water. Also, waves create buoyancy stresses on the structure of a hull. The weight of breaking waves on the fabric of the ship force the crew to reduce speed or even travel in the same direction as the waves to prevent damage. Also, wind stresses the rigging of sailing ships.

The force of the wind pushes ships in the direction of the wind. Vessels with large windage suffer most. Although powered ships are able to resist the force of the wind, sailing vessels have few defences against strong wind. When strong winds are imminent, sailing vessels typically have several choices:
 try to position themselves so that they cannot be blown into danger
 shelter in a harbour
 anchor, preferably on the leeward side of a landform

Many losses of sailing ships were caused by sailing, with a following wind, so far into a bay that the ship became trapped upwind of a lee shore, being unable to sail into the wind to leave the bay. Low visibility caused by fog, mist and heavy rain increase the navigator's problems. Cold can cause metal to become brittle and fail more easily. A build-up of ice can cause instability by accumulating high on the ship, or in severe cases, crush the hull if the ship becomes trapped in a freezing sea.

Rogue waves 
According to one scientist who studies rogue waves, "two large ships sink every week on average, but the cause is never studied to the same detail as an air crash. It simply gets put down to 'bad weather'." Once considered mythical and lacking hard evidence for their existence, rogue waves are now proven to exist and known to be a natural ocean phenomenon. During that event, minor damage was also inflicted on the platform, far above sea level, confirming that the reading was valid. Their existence has also since been confirmed by satellite imagery of the ocean surface.

Fire
Fire can cause the loss of ships in many ways. The most obvious way would be the loss of a wooden ship which is burned until watertight integrity is compromised (e.g. Cospatrick). The detonation of cargo or ammunition can cause the breach of a steel hull. An extreme temperature may compromise the durability properties of steel, causing the hull to break on its own weight. Often a large fire causes a ship to be abandoned and left to drift (e.g. MS Achille Lauro). Should it run aground beyond economic salvage, it becomes a wreck.

In extreme cases, where the ship's cargo is either highly combustible (such as oil, natural gas or gasoline) or explosive (nitrates, fertilizers, ammunition) a fire onboard may result in a catastrophic conflagration or explosion. Such disasters may have catastrophic results, especially if the disaster occurs in a harbour, such as the Halifax Explosion.

Navigation errors 

Many shipwrecks have occurred when the crew of the ship allowed the ship to collide with rocks, reefs, icebergs, or other ships. Collision has been one of the major causes of shipwreck. Accurate navigation is made more difficult by poor visibility in bad weather. Also, many losses happened before modern navigation aids such as GPS, radar and sonar were available. Until the 20th century, the most sophisticated navigational tools and techniques available - dead reckoning using the magnetic compass, marine chronometer (to calculate longitude) and ships logbook (which recorded the vessel's heading and the speed measured by log) or celestial navigation using marine chronometer and sextant - were sufficiently accurate for journeys across oceans, but these techniques (and in many cases also the charts) lacked the precision to avoid reefs close to shore. 

The Scilly naval disaster of 1707, which claimed nearly 2,000 lives and was one of the greatest maritime disasters in the history of the British Isles, is attributed to the mariner's inability to find their longitude. This led to the Longitude Act to improve the aids available for navigation. Marine chronometers were as revolutionary in the 19th century as GPS is today.  However the cost of these instruments could be prohibitive, sometimes resulting in tragic consequences for ships that were still unable to determine their longitude, as in the case of the Arniston.

Even today, when highly accurate navigational equipment is readily available and universally used, there is still scope for error. Using the incorrect horizontal datum for the chart of an area may mislead the navigator, especially as many charts have not been updated to use modern data. It is also important for the navigator to appreciate that charts may be significantly in error, especially on less frequented coasts. For example, a recent revision of the map of South Georgia in the South Atlantic showed that previous maps were in some places in error by several kilometres.

Over the centuries, many technological and organizational developments have been used to reduce accidents at sea including:
 International Regulations for Preventing Collisions at Sea
 Pilotage aids including lighthouses and sea marks
 Basic navigation tools such as the magnetic compass, nautical chart, marine chronometer, sextant, log and sounding line
 Advanced navigation tools such as radio communication, radar navigation, gyrocompass, sonar, hyperbolic Radio navigation and satellite navigation
 Inspection of shipbuilding quality and maintenance of seaworthiness of the ship such as "A1 at Lloyd's"
 Intelligence and better defences to protect the ship from acts of violence, war and piracy
 Use of fireproof/nonflammable materials to prevent fires from spreading rapidly, and modern fire-fighting agents such as gases and foams that do not compromise the buoyancy and stability of the vessel as quickly as water.
 Built-in devices to delay flooding long enough for rescue ships to retrieve survivors and/or tow the ship to the nearest shipyard for repairs, such as watertight compartments and pumps.

See also 
 Flotsam and jetsam
 List of shipwrecks
 List of disasters
 List of maritime disasters
 Beaching (nautical)

References

Further reading 
 Hans Blumenberg, Shipwreck with Spectator: Paradigm of a Metaphor for Existence (Cambridge, Massachusetts: MIT Press, 1997)

External links 

 Maritimequest Shipwreck Database (Downloadable Excel file)
 NOAA Wrecks and Obstructions Database 
 Shipwrecks and Smuggling - a learning resource from the British Library archives
 Shipwrecks UK, providing context, thematic information and detail for more than 45,000 shipwrecks in the seas surrounding Britain and Ireland, including revealing maps.

 
Nautical terminology